Calling Up Spirits is an album by the surf guitarist Dick Dale, released in 1996. It was dedicated to the American Indians.

Dale supported the album by playing the 1996 Warped Tour.

Production
The album contains a cover of Jimi Hendrix's "Third Stone from the Sun". Vince Welnick contributed to Calling Up Spirits. Ron Eglit, Dale's longtime bass player, received a producer credit.

Critical reception

Entertainment Weekly wrote that the "mix of covers, remakes of [Dale's] '60s surf hits, and ecologically minded new material feels thin and lacks the cohesiveness of previous efforts." The Vancouver Sun stated: "Playing speedy as ever, Dale returns to the land he founded: a mix of eastern-tinged influences (his dad was Lebanese) rolled up in surf wax and thrown into the wide-open waves." The Calgary Herald concluded: "From his raunchy title track and the bongo-beat hipness of 'Fever' to his twang reworking of Jimi Hendrix's 'Third Stone From The Sun', he embodies rock guitar cool."

AllMusic wrote that "Dale only manages to capture his manic energy on the cover version of Jimi Hendrix' 'Third Stone From the Sun'."

Track listing 
All tracks composed by Dick Dale, except where indicated
"Nitrus" – 3:29
"The Wedge Paradiso" – 2:37
"The Pit" – 2:38
"Fever" (J. Davenport, E. Dooley) – 4:46
"Doom Box" – 3:04
"Catamount" – 3:05
"Window" – 4:22
"Calling Up Spirits" – 3:50
"Temple of Gizeh" – 6:16
"Bandito" – 5:32
"Third Stone from the Sun" (Jimi Hendrix) – 6:32
"Peppermint Man" (A. Willis) – 4:11
"Gypsy Fire" – 3:13

Personnel 
 Dick Dale – guitar, trumpet, vocals
 Ron Eglit – bass guitar, background vocals
 Prairie Prince – drums, percussion, background vocals
 Scott Mathews – drums, percussion, background vocals
Additional musicians
 Vincent Welnick – organ, piano, background vocals
 Bobby Stricklan – didgeridoo, background vocals
 Jill Dale – drums, background vocals
 Ko Mathews – background vocals

Recorded January 1996 at Prairie Sun Recording, Cotati, California.

References

1996 albums
Dick Dale albums
Beggars Banquet Records albums